Jurit Ampil Kridha Warastra  is a classical Javanese dance originating from Salatiga, Central Java, Indonesia. The dance depicts the concubines from Mangkunegara I or Raden Mas Said in the Salatiga Agreement. This dance is can be performed in teams, in pairs, and individually. The classic elements of the dance are found in the movement, song accompaniment, clothing, and make-up, but now they have been combined with new elements that follow the times.

Meaning and History
This dance has meanings, jurit which means 'soldier', garwa ampil which means 'concubine' (from Mangkunegara I), and warastra which means 'gendewa'. In general, the dance depicts the 'garwa ampil' from Mangkunegara I in the Salatiga Agreement which was held on March 17, 1757. Each party (Hamengkubuwana I, Pakubuwana III, and Mangkunegara I) in the agreement agreed to bring  and show the strength of his army. Mangkunegara I showed some of the brigadas (units of soldiers) he had brought, one of which was Jurit Ampil, which was a unit of female warriors from his concubines.

Form and movement
Jurit Ampil Kridha Warastra dance is classified as a freelance dance, meaning that it can be performed in teams, pairs, and singly. The classic elements of the dance are found in the movement, song accompaniment, clothing, and make-up, but now they have been combined with new elements that follow the times. This dance is also a blend of classical Surakarta style dance and folk dance, which takes many movements from the Warrior dance. The musical accompaniment in it uses the Javanese gamelan which includes gender, kendang, demung, saron, kenong, kempul, and gongs, while the forms of the gending are lancaran, srepeg, dan palaran.

The clothing worn in the dance is a warrior princess with her hair in a small bun and wearing a golden crown. His main shirt is blue with short sleeves with gold trim and belt, while his pants are knee-length. For weapons use jemparing (archery), endhong, nyenyep, gendewa, and cundrik. The dancers' make-up aims to help shape the character and soul of a soldier.

See also

 Wayang wong
 Bambangan cakil
 Javanese dance
 Dance in Indonesia

References

Dance in Indonesia
Dances of Java
Javanese culture